The 2022 FIM Bajas World Cup season is the 11th season of the FIM Bajas World Cup, an international rally raid competition for motorbikes, quads and SSVs.

Calendar
The calendar for the 2022 season originally had ten baja-style events scheduled, with some of the events also being part of 2022 FIA World Cup for Cross-Country Bajas. The Atacama Baja doubleheader was later removed from the schedule.

Regulations
The following classes and categories are included:
Category 1: Bike (Up to 450cc single or twin cylinder, 2T or 4T)
Category 2: Quads (three-wheel vehicles are forbidden)
Category 3: SSV
Class 1: Women
Class 2: Junior
Class 3: Veterans

The FIM will award the World Cup to both riders and manufacturers of the bike category; also to riders only in the quad, and SSV (driver and co-driver) categories, as well as to riders only in the woman, and junior classes. A Trophy is awarded to the winners of the veterans category. Any other category, i.e. “Over 450cc” do not count for any of the FIM Baja World Cups.

Teams and riders

Results

Motorbikes

Quads

SSVs

Championship standings

Riders' championship
 Points for final positions in the first nine rounds are awarded as follows:

 Points for final positions in the final round are awarded as follows:

A rider's best two results from the first seven rounds, along with their result at the final round, will count for the championship standings.

Motorbikes

Quads

Women

Junior

Veteran

SSVs

Manufacturers Championship
 Points for manufacturers are awarded by the points of the top two riders per manufacturer at each baja being added together:

References

External links
 

FIM Cross-Country Rallies World Championship
Bajas World Cup
Bajas